Apocalypto is a 2006 historical epic film produced, co-written, and directed by Mel Gibson. The film features a cast of Native American and Indigenous Mexican actors consisting of Rudy Youngblood, Raoul Trujillo, Mayra Sérbulo, Dalia Hernández, Gerardo Taracena, Rodolfo Palacios, Bernardo Ruiz Juarez, Ammel Rodrigo Mendoza, Ricardo Diaz Mendoza, and Israel Contreras. All of the indigenous people depicted in the film were Maya. Similar to Gibson's earlier film The Passion of the Christ, all dialogue is in a modern approximation of the ancient language of the setting. Here, the Indigenous Yucatec Mayan language is spoken with subtitles, which sometimes refer to the language as Mayan. 

Principal photography took place in Mexico from 21 November 2005 and ended in July 2006. This was the last film Gibson directed until 2016's Hacksaw Ridge ten years later.

Set in Yucatán, Mexico, around the year 1502, Apocalypto portrays the hero's journey of a young man named Jaguar Paw, a late Mesoamerican hunter and his fellow tribesmen who are captured by an invading force. After the devastation of their village, they are brought on a perilous journey to a Mayan city for human sacrifice at a time when the Mayan civilization is in decline. The film was a box office success, grossing over $120 million worldwide, and received mostly positive reviews, with critics praising Gibson's direction, Dean Semler's cinematography, and the performances of the cast, though the portrayal of Mayan civilization and historical accuracy were criticized. The film was distributed by Buena Vista Pictures in North America and Icon Film Distribution in the United Kingdom and Australia.

Plot
While hunting in the Mesoamerican rainforest, Jaguar Paw, his father Flint Sky, and their fellow tribesmen encounter a contingent of fleeing refugees. The group's leader explains that their lands were ravaged and asks for permission to pass through the jungle. Flint Sky notes that the refugees are sick with fear and urges Jaguar Paw to never allow fear to infect him. Later that night, the tribe gathers around an elder who tells a prophetic story about a being who is consumed by an emptiness that cannot be satisfied, despite having all the gifts of the world offered to him. The being will continue blindly taking until there is nothing left in the world for him to take, and the world is no more.

The next morning, the village is attacked by Raiders led by Zero Wolf. Huts are set on fire, many villagers are killed, and the surviving adults are taken prisoner. During the attack, Jaguar Paw lowers his pregnant wife Seven and their young son Turtles Run into a cenote. Returning to the fight, Jaguar Paw nearly kills the sadistic Raider named Middle Eye but is eventually captured. When Middle Eye realizes that Flint Sky is Jaguar Paw's father, he kills Flint Sky and mockingly renames Jaguar Paw "Almost". The Raiders tie the captives together and set out on a long forced march through the jungle, leaving the children behind to fend for themselves. The refugees from earlier are also shown to have been taken captive. Meanwhile, Seven and Turtles Run remain trapped in the well after a suspicious Raider severs the vine leading out of it.

As the party approaches the Raiders' Mayan city, they encounter razed forests and vast fields of failed maize crops, alongside villages decimated by an unknown disease. They then pass a little girl infected with the plague who prophesies the end of the Mayan world. Once the Raiders and captives reach the city, the females are sold into slavery while the males are escorted to the top of a step pyramid to be sacrificed before the Mayan king and queen.

Two captives are sacrificed, their still-beating hearts torn from their chests. But as Jaguar Paw is laid out on the altar, a solar eclipse gives the high priest pause, and the Mayans take the event as an omen that the gods are satisfied and conclude the ceremony, sparing the remaining captives.

The remaining captives are then taken by the Raiders to be used as target practice and offered freedom if they can run to safety. The first pair of captives to attempt the run across the arena are struck down. Jaguar Paw suffers an arrow wound but escapes into the jungle, killing Zero Wolf's son Cut Rock in the process. Zero Wolf and Middle Eye take their men to chase after him. Reflecting on his father's lesson about fear, Jaguar Paw resolves to kill his pursuers with the resources the jungle provides him. He dares the nine Raiders to challenge him, and they die one by one. One Raider is killed by a jaguar, a second by a venomous snake, and a third killed by Zero Wolf himself for cowardice. A fourth drowns after crushing his skull against a rock. Fleeing back into the jungle, Jaguar Paw nearly sinks in quicksand but calmly escapes. The fifth is shot by Jaguar Paw with poisoned darts. Jaguar Paw then kills Middle Eye with a stone hatchet before leading Zero Wolf into a trap where he is impaled by a large wooden spike. The last two Raiders continue to pursue Jaguar Paw further into the jungle.

Later, a heavy downpour threatens to drown Jaguar Paw's family, who remain trapped in the pit. Seven gives birth to another son, born under the surface of the dangerously rising water. Meanwhile, the two remaining Raiders pursue Jaguar Paw towards the coast, where they all witness the astonishing sight of Spanish conquistadors approaching the shore. As the Raiders are confounded by the Spanish ships and start walking towards the coast, Jaguar Paw seizes the opportunity to escape and return to his village.

Jaguar Paw returns just in time to save his family from the flooding pit and is overjoyed at the sight of his newborn son. Later, the reunited family gazes out over the water at the Spanish ships. Jaguar Paw chooses not to approach the strangers, and they depart. The family returns to the jungle to seek a fresh start, far away from the Mayan Raiders and the new arrivals.

Cast

Production

Screenplay

Screenwriter and co-producer Farhad Safinia first met Mel Gibson while working as an assistant during the post-production of The Passion of the Christ. Eventually, Gibson and Safinia found time to discuss "their mutual love of movies and what excites them about moviemaking".

Gibson said they wanted to "shake up the stale action-adventure genre", which he felt was dominated by CGI, stock stories and shallow characters and to create a footchase that would "feel like a car chase that just keeps turning the screws."

Gibson and Safinia were also interested in portraying and exploring an ancient culture as it existed before the arrival of the Europeans. Considering both the Aztecs and the Maya, they eventually chose the Maya for their high sophistication and their eventual decline.

The two researched ancient Maya history, reading both creation and destruction myths, including sacred texts such as the Popul Vuh. In the audio commentary of the film's first DVD release, Safinia states that the old shaman's story (played by Espiridion Acosta Cache, a modern-day Maya storyteller) was modified from an authentic Mesoamerican tale that was re-translated by Hilario Chi Canul, a professor of Maya, into the Yucatec Maya language for the film. He also served as a dialogue coach during production. As they researched the script, Safinia and Gibson traveled to Guatemala, Costa Rica and the Yucatán Peninsula to scout filming locations and visit Maya ruins.

Striving for a degree of historical accuracy, the filmmakers employed a consultant, Richard D. Hansen, a specialist in the Maya and assistant professor of archaeology at Idaho State University. As director of the Mirador Basin Project, he works to preserve a large swath of the Guatemalan rain forest and its Maya ruins. Gibson has said of Hansen's involvement: "Richard's enthusiasm for what he does is infectious. He was able to reassure us and make us feel secure that what we were writing had some authenticity as well as imagination."

Other scholars of Mesoamerican history criticized the film for what they said were numerous inaccuracies. Hansen published an essay on the film and a critical commentary on the criticisms of the film.

Gibson decided that all the dialogue would be in the Yucatec Maya language. Gibson explains: "I think hearing a different language allows the audience to completely suspend their own reality and get drawn into the world of the film. And more importantly, this also puts the emphasis on the cinematic visuals, which are a kind of universal language of the heart."

Costumes and makeup

The production team consisted of a large group of make-up artists and costume designers who worked to recreate the Maya look for the large cast. Led by Aldo Signoretti, the make-up artists daily applied the required tattoos, scarification, and earlobe extensions to all of the on-screen actors. According to advisor Richard D. Hansen, the choices in body make-up were based on both artistic license and fact: "I spent hours and hours going through the pottery and the images looking for tattoos. The scarification and tattooing was all researched, the inlaid jade teeth are in there, the ear spools are in there. There is a little doohickey that comes down from the ear through the nose into the septum – that was entirely their artistic innovation." An example of attention to detail is the left arm tattoo of Seven, Jaguar Paw's wife, which is a horizontal band with two dots above – the Mayan symbol for the number seven.

Simon Atherton, an English armorer and weapon-maker who worked with Gibson on Braveheart, was hired to research and provide reconstructions of Maya weapons. Atherton also has a cameo as the cross-bearing Franciscan friar who appears on a Spanish ship at the end of the film.

Set design

Mel Gibson wanted Apocalypto to feature sets with buildings rather than relying on computer-generated images. Most of the step pyramids seen at the Maya city were models designed by Thomas E. Sanders. Sanders explained his approach: "We wanted to set up the Mayan world, but we were not trying to do a documentary. Visually, we wanted to go for what would have the most impact. Just as on Braveheart, you are treading the line of history and cinematography. Our job is to do a beautiful movie."

However, while many of the architectural details of Maya cities are correct, they are blended from different locations and eras, a decision Farhad Safinia said was made for aesthetic reasons. While Apocalypto is set during the terminal post-classic period of Maya civilization, the central pyramid of the film comes from the classic period, which ended in AD 900, such as those found in the Postclassic sites of Muyil, Coba, and others in Quintana Roo, Mexico, where later cities are built around earlier pyramids. The temples are in the shape of those of Tikal in the central lowlands classic style but decorated with the Puuc style elements of the northwest Yucatán centuries later. Richard D. Hansen comments, "There was nothing in the post-classic period that would match the size and majesty of that pyramid in the film. But Gibson ... was trying to depict opulence, wealth, consumption of resources." The mural in the arched walkway combined elements from the Maya codices, the Bonampak murals (over 700 years earlier than the film's setting), and the San Bartolo murals (some 1500 years earlier than the film's setting).

Filming
Gibson filmed Apocalypto mainly in Catemaco, San Andrés Tuxtla and Paso de Ovejas in the Mexican state of Veracruz. The waterfall scene was filmed at Eyipantla Falls, located in San Andrés Tuxtla. Other filming by second-unit crews took place in El Petén, Guatemala. The film was originally slated for an August 4, 2006, release, but Touchstone Pictures delayed the release date to December 8, 2006, due to heavy rains and two hurricanes interfering with filming in Mexico. Principal photography ended in July 2006.

Apocalypto was shot on high-definition digital video, using the Panavision Genesis camera. During filming, Gibson and cinematographer Dean Semler employed Spydercam, a suspended camera system allowing shooting from above. This equipment was used in a scene in which Jaguar Paw leaps off a waterfall.

A number of animals are featured in Apocalypto, including a Baird's tapir and a black jaguar. Animatronics or puppets were employed for the scenes injurious to animals.

Music

The music to Apocalypto was composed by James Horner in his third collaboration with director Mel Gibson. The non-traditional score features a large array of exotic instruments and vocals by Pakistani singer Rahat Fateh Ali Khan.

Distribution and marketing
While Mel Gibson financed the film through his Icon Productions, Disney signed on to distribute Apocalypto for a fee in certain markets under the Touchstone Pictures label in North America, and Icon Film Distribution in the UK and Australia. The publicity for the film started with a December 2005 teaser trailer that was filmed before the start of principal photography and before Rudy Youngblood was cast as Jaguar Paw. As a joke, Gibson inserted a subliminal cameo of the bearded director in a plaid shirt with a cigarette hanging from his mouth posing next to a group of dust-covered Maya. A clean-shaven Gibson also filmed a Mayan-language segment for the introduction of the 2006 Academy Awards in which he declined to host the ceremony.

On September 23, 2006, Gibson pre-screened the unfinished film to two predominantly Native American audiences in the US state of Oklahoma, at the Riverwind Casino in Goldsby, owned by the Chickasaw Nation, and at Cameron University in Lawton. He also commenced a pre-screening in Austin, Texas, on September 24 in conjunction with one of the film's stars, Rudy Youngblood. In Los Angeles, Gibson screened Apocalypto and participated in a Q&A session for Latin Business Association and for members of the Maya community. Due to an enthusiastic response from exhibitors, Disney opened the film on more than 2,500 screens in the United States.

Themes
According to Mel Gibson, the Mayan setting of Apocalypto is "merely the backdrop" for a more universal story of exploring "civilizations and what undermines them". The filmmakers intended for the collapse of Maya to mirror issues seen in contemporary society. The problems "faced by the Maya are extraordinarily similar to those faced today by our own civilization," co-writer Safinia stated during production, "especially when it comes to widespread environmental degradation, excessive consumption and political corruption". Gibson has stated that the film is an attempt at illustrating the parallels between a great fallen empire of the past and the great empires of today. 

The film serves as a cultural critique – in Hansen's words, a "social statement" – sending the message that it is never a mistake to question our own assumptions about morality. Gibson has defined the title, based on Greek word (apokaluptō), as "a new beginning or an unveiling – a revelation...Everything has a beginning and an end, and all civilizations have operated like that".

Reception

Critical response
On review aggregator website Rotten Tomatoes, the film holds an approval rating of 65% based on 200 reviews, with an average rating of 6.40/10. The site's critical consensus reads: "Apocalypto is a brilliantly filmed, if mercilessly bloody, examination of a once great civilization." On Metacritic, the film has a weighted average score of 68 out of 100, based on 37 critics, indicating "generally favorable reviews". Audiences polled by CinemaScore gave the film an average grade of "B+" on an A+ to F scale.

Richard Roeper and guest critic Aisha Tyler on the television show Ebert & Roeper gave it "two thumbs up" rating. Michael Medved gave Apocalypto four out of four stars calling the film "an adrenaline-drenched chase movie" and "a visceral visual experience."

The film was released less than six months after Gibson's 2006 DUI incident, which garnered Gibson much negative publicity and magnified concerns some had over alleged antisemitism in his previous film, The Passion of the Christ.  Several key film critics alluded to the incident in their reviews of Apocalypto: In his positive review, The New York Times A. O. Scott commented: "say what you will about him – about his problem with booze or his problem with Jews – he is a serious filmmaker."  The Boston Globes review came to a similar conclusion, noting that "Gibson may be a lunatic, but he's our lunatic, and while I wouldn't wish him behind the wheel of a car after happy hour or at a B'nai Brith function anytime, behind a camera is another matter."  In a negative review, Salon.com noted "People are curious about this movie because of what might be called extra-textual reasons, because its director is an erratic and charismatic Hollywood figure who would have totally marginalized himself by now if he didn't possess a crude gift for crafting violent pop entertainment."

Apocalypto gained some passionate champions in the Hollywood community. Actor Robert Duvall called it "maybe the best movie I've seen in 25 years". Director Quentin Tarantino said, "I think it's a masterpiece. It was perhaps the best film of that year. I think it was the best artistic film of that year." Martin Scorsese, writing about the film, called it "a vision," adding, "Many pictures today don't go into troubling areas like this, the importance of violence in the perpetuation of what's known as civilization. I admire Apocalypto for its frankness, but also for the power and artistry of the filmmaking." Actor Edward James Olmos said, "I was totally caught off guard. It's arguably the best movie I've seen in years. I was blown away." In 2013, director Spike Lee put the film on his list of all-time essential films.

In Mexico, the film registered a wider number of viewers than Perfume and Rocky Balboa. It even displaced memorable Mexican premieres such as Titanic and Poseidon. According to polls performed by the newspaper Reforma, 80% of polled Mexicans labeled the film as "very good" or "good".

Representation of the Maya

Aspects of Mayan culture and civilization depicted in Apocalypto are considered by scholars to be historically inaccurate. According to Allan Wall of Banderas News, "The art, architecture and setting of the movie mixes aspects of different epochs and regions within the Mayan civilization." Some scholars have pointed out that the depiction of mass human sacrifices and widespread slavery was more typical of the Aztecs. In contrast, Mayanist David Stuart stated that human sacrifice was not rare and based on carvings and mural paintings, there are "more and greater similarities between the Aztecs and Mayas."

Aside from the controversy surrounding the alleged historical inaccuracies, scholars and indigenous activists were concerned over the film's highlighting the human sacrifices that occurred during the later years before the Spanish conquest. Anthropologist Traci Ardren felt that Apocalypto was biased because "no mention is made of the achievements in science and art, the profound spirituality and connection to agricultural cycles, or the engineering feats of Maya cities". The film has also been criticized by Guatemalan activist Ignacio Ochoa as "an offensive and racist notion that Maya people were brutal to one another long before the arrival of Europeans and thus they deserved, in fact, needed, rescue."

Richard D. Hansen, a historical consultant on the film, stated in an interview with The Washington Post that the film does "give the feeling [that the Maya were] a sadistic lot", and expressed being "a little apprehensive about how the contemporary Maya will take it." The film's focus on "gratuitous violence" led Julia Guernsey, a professor of Mesoamerican art and culture, to condemn the film, stating in an interview, "there's a lot of really offensive racial stereotyping. They're shown as these extremely barbaric people, when in fact, the Maya were a very sophisticated culture." Guernsey points out that the film is seen through the lens of Western morality and states that it is important to examine "alternative world views that might not match our own 21st century Western ones but are nonetheless valid."

Human sacrifice

Apocalypto has been criticized for its depictions of mass sacrifices that were more typical for Aztecs than Mayas. Human sacrifice was "arguably less common in ancient Maya society." According to Hansen, the film depicts the post-classic period when the Maya were influenced by the Toltecs and Aztecs. Hansen states, "We know warfare was going on. The Postclassic center of Tulum is a walled city; these sites had to be in defensive positions. There was tremendous Aztec influence by this time. The Aztecs were clearly ruthless in their conquest and pursuit of sacrificial victims, a practice that spilled over into some of the Maya areas."

Other disputed depictions of the Mayas include the sacrifice of commoners and mass graves. The Mayas sacrificed nobility and societal elites instead of commoners according to Anthropology professor Stephen Houston. Archaeological sites indicate that the Mayans used several methods for sacrifice such as "decapitation, heart excision, dismemberment, hanging, disembowelment, skin flaying, skull splitting and burning." Anthropologists have also pointed out that there is no evidence of mass graves in Maya as depicted in the film. Hansen states that this is "conjecture", saying that "all [Gibson was] trying to do there is express the horror of it". Another disputed scene, when Jaguar Paw and the rest of the captives are used as target practice, was acknowledged by the filmmakers to be invented as a plot device for igniting the chase sequence.

Ending
According to the DVD commentary track by Mel Gibson and Farhad Safinia, the ending of the film was meant to depict the first contact between the Spaniards and Mayas that took place in 1511 when Pedro de Alvarado arrived on the coast of the Yucatán and Guatemala, and also during the fourth voyage of Christopher Columbus in 1502. The arrival of the Europeans in Apocalypto and its thematic meaning is a subject of disagreement. Traci Ardren, anthropologist, wrote that the arrival of the Spanish as Christian missionaries had a "blatantly colonial message that the Mayas needed saving because they were 'rotten at the core.'" According to Ardren, Apocalypto "replays, in glorious big-budget technicolor, an offensive and racist notion that Maya people were brutal to one another long before the arrival of Europeans and thus they deserved, in fact, they needed, rescue. This same idea was used for 500 years to justify the subjugation of Maya people." David van Biema, in an article written for Time magazine, questions whether the Spaniards are portrayed as saviors of the Mayas since they are depicted ominously with Jaguar Paw acknowledging their arrival as a threat and deciding to return to the woods.

Awards and nominations

See also
 List of films featuring eclipses
 Survival film

References

External links

 
 
 
 
 
 AFI Catalog of Feature Films

2000s American films
2000s action adventure films
2000s chase films
2000s historical adventure films
2006 action films
2006 films
American action adventure films
American adventure drama films
American chase films
American epic films
American historical adventure films
American survival films
Films about kidnapping
Films about human sacrifice
Films directed by Mel Gibson
Films produced by Bruce Davey
Films produced by Mel Gibson
Films scored by James Horner
Films set in Guatemala
Films set in Mesoamerica
Films set in jungles
Films set in pre-Columbian America
Films set in the 1500s
Films shot in Mexico
Films with screenplays by Farhad Safinia
Films with screenplays by Mel Gibson
Icon Productions films
Indigenous cinema in Latin America
Indigenous films
Jungle adventure films
Mayan-language films
Scanbox Entertainment films
Touchstone Pictures films
Yucatec Maya language